Class M may refer to:

 Class M (or M-class) planet, a classification used in the Star Trek media franchise
 Class M star, a stellar classification
 Class M, a driver's license, for motorcycles in the United States
 SCORE Class M-Truck, off-road racing medium utility vehicles

See also
 M class (disambiguation)